Bigg Boss OTT 1, also known as Bigg Boss: Over-The-Top, is the first season of the Indian reality digital series Bigg Boss, the first to be released exclusively on OTT platforms Voot and Voot Select. It premiered on 8 August 2021 on Viacom18's streaming service Voot and premium streaming service Voot Select with Karan Johar as the host of this digital-only season. The Grand Finale of the show took place on 18 September 2021 and Divya Agarwal emerged as the winner, while Nishant Bhat emerged as the runner-up.

Production 

Teaser On 24 July 2021, Voot unveiled a poster with Karan Johar as the host of this digital exclusive season. On 3 August, Voot unveiled a third promo with Karan Johar revealing the format of the season being much more bolder and crazier ever in the history.

Broadcast Apart from the usual hour-long episode, viewers will also have access to the direct 24x7 camera footage. The show will be streamed Monday-Saturday at 7pm and on Sunday at 8pm. The episodes will be first telecasted through 24 Hours Live Channel at 7pm Mon-Sat and at 8pm Sun on paid subscription of Voot Select, then it will be shown for free next morning at 9am (later shown for free at 10pm same night) on Voot. The episodes also started to telecast on Colors TV late night but it later stopped telecasting on television.

House The house this year is made with the theme "Stay Connected". The house consists of a Patio, Living Room, Kitchen, Bathroom, Bedroom, Garden Area, Confession Room, Dining Table, Swimming Pool and specially for the theme, they added a special room called "Stay Connected Room". The bedroom contains bunk beds this year and the house seems to be carnival-type designed one.

Concept 
ThemeThis season was a first-time ever in the history of Bigg Boss, that launched 6 weeks before the television version on an OTT platform Voot. The season's theme was "Stay Connected" and  6 boys & 6 girls entered as pairs while 1 girl entered alone. The contestants had to work on making the bond with their connection stronger and survive in the game. On Day 29, Bigg Boss announced that all connections are now broken and all the housemates will play as individuals.

FeaturesThe makers have also launched many new features that will give powers to the audience such as Live Nominations, Punishments and Daily Report Card.

Ticket to Bigg Boss 15
All five finalists were offered Ticket to Bigg Boss 15 but the condition was that they would be out from finale race. Pratik Sehajpal chose the offer and he officially became the first contestant of Bigg Boss 15.

Bigg Boss 15As per the show's concept, Finalists Shamita Shetty, Nishant Bhat and Pratik Sehajpal were qualified to participate in Bigg Boss 15. Later Raqesh Bapat and Neha Bhasin entered the Bigg Boss 15 as wildcard contestants but they couldn't survive for much time . Later Shetty, Bhat and Sehajpal made it into finale week of Bigg Boss 15 by living in for 17 weeks, covering more hardship journey than OTT and ended up becoming as 3rd,4th,1st Runner-ups respectively.

Housemate Status

Housemates 
The participants in the order of appearance and entered in stage are:
 
 Raqesh Bapat - Television and film actor. He is known for acting in films like Tum Bin, Dil Vil Pyar Vyar and Heroine. He has also worked in Popular television shows like Maryada: Lekin Kab Tak? and Qubool Hai.
 Zeeshan Khan - Television actor and YouTuber. He is known for TV series Kumkum Bhagya. He got famous after the video where he tried boarding his flight in a bathrobe uploaded on his YouTube Channel ZSQUAD VLOGS went viral.
 Millind Gaba - Singer. He is known for his songs Nazar Lag Jayegi, She Don't Know and Yaar Mod Do.
 Nishant Bhat - Choreographer. He has been a part of dance reality shows like Super Dancer, Jhalak Dikhhla Jaa and Dance Deewane. 
 Karan Nath - Film actor. He is known for acting in the film Yeh Dil Aashiqanaa.
 Pratik Sehajpal - Reality television star and model. He has participated in reality shows like MTV Love School and Ace of Space 1.
 Shamita Shetty - Film actress. She made her film debut with Mohabbatein. She also participated in Bigg Boss Season 3 and Fear Factor: Khatron Ke Khiladi 9.
 Uorfi Javed - Television actress. She is known for acting in Kasautii Zindagii Kay and Bepannah.
 Neha Bhasin - Singer. She is known for her song Dhunki, Jag ghoomeya and Bajre da sitta.
 Muskan Jattana - Social activist. She makes videos on women's rights and other social issues.
 Akshara Singh - Bhojpuri television actress. She is one of the famous and highest paid Bhojpuri actress.
 Divya Agarwal - Actress and model. She is the winner of Ace of Space 1 and Runner-up of MTV Splitsvilla 10.
 Ridhima Pandit - Television actress. She is known for her role in Bahu Hamari Rajni Kant. She also participated in Fear Factor: Khatron Ke Khiladi 9.

Twists

Connections
Before entering the House, the housemates had to pair up with one co-contestant as connection. Divya Agarwal entered the House without any connection which resulted in Divya being nominated. On Day 30, all the pairs were broken.

Notes
 Divya Agarwal was directly nominated on the Premiere Night as there was no connection left for her.On Day 4, there was an opportunity given to the boys where any one boy could press the buzzer within 2 hours and make Divya his connection. Zeeshan Khan pressed the buzzer and now his connection is Divya Agarwal while Urfi Javed got nominated as no connections were left for her.
 On Day 16, the housemates were given a chance to change their connections in the Game Of Hearts Task. Pratik-Neha and Milind-Akshara became the new connections.
 On Day 18, Zeeshan was ejected from the house after getting in a physical fight with Pratik.
 On Day 30, Bigg Boss announced that all Contestants will play as individuals.

Guest appearances

Weekly Summary

Nominations table 

Color Keys
  indicates the Boss Lady and Boss Man.
  indicates that the Housemate was safe prior to nominations.
  indicates that the Housemate was nominated for eviction.
  indicates that the Housemate has been evicted.
  indicates that the Housemate has been ejected.

Nomination notes
 : Divya was directly nominated on premiere night as there were no connections left but was saved on Day 4 when Zeeshan broke his connection with Urfi and chose Divya as his connection during the Buzzer Task.
 : Muskan and Nishant saved themselves from Nomination in Week 1 on a condition that they would be nominated for Week 2. They later won the Immunity Task on Day 7 and this condition no longer applied.
 : Bigg Boss nominated everyone including the Boss Lady & Man as punishment when the housemates couldn't reach a decision during the Nomination Task.
 : Pratik Sehajpal chose Direct Entry to Bigg Boss 15.
 : Nishant Bhat and Shamita Shetty will participate in Bigg Boss 15.
Raqesh and  Neha  also participated in Bigg Boss 15 as wildcards.

References

External links 
 Bigg Boss OTT on Voot

Bigg Boss (Hindi TV series) seasons
2021 Indian television seasons